Chris Doherty (born 1965 in Braintree, Massachusetts) is a musician, singer-songwriter best known as the founder of hardcore punk band Gang Green.  Doherty graduated from Braintree High School in 1983.

Gang Green
The lone constant in the lineup, lead singer/guitarist Chris Doherty has remained with Gang Green, off and on, for more than two decades.  He formed the first incarnation of Gang Green in 1982, the second in 1985, and a third in 1997.  They still continue to play live shows in the Boston area.

Other projects

1980s
Doherty joined punk band, Jerry's Kids in 1982, and later moved on to Stranglehold and the ska band the Cheapskates.

1990s
Doherty formed and fronted Klover, a punk band which released one album, Feel Lucky Punk?, on Mercury Records in 1995. After Klover broke up, he formed another band, Hamerd, before reforming the current version of Gang Green in 1997.

On October 31, 2018, Doherty suffered a major stroke that affected both his heart and brain and left him paralyzed on his left side. Since then, he has remained in physical therapy and rehabilitation.

References

1965 births
American punk rock musicians
American rock singers
American rock songwriters
American male singer-songwriters
Living people
People from Braintree, Massachusetts
Singer-songwriters from Massachusetts
Braintree High School alumni